Maulvi Faizullah is a Taliban leader
In September 2003 CNN characterized Maulvi Faizullah as a senior Taliban commander.

References

Taliban leaders
Pashtun people
Living people
Year of birth missing (living people)